The 2021 SMP Russian Circuit Racing Series was the eighth season of the Russian Circuit Racing Series, organized by SMP Racing. It was the seventh season with TCR class cars. In 2021, the competition was held in seven classes: Touring, Touring Light, Super Production, S1600, S1600 Junior, GT4 and CN.

Teams and drivers
Yokohama was the official tyre supplier.

Touring / TCR Russian Touring Car Championship

Super Production
All teams and drivers are Russian-registered.

Touring Light
All teams and drivers are Russian-registered.

S1600
All teams and drivers are Russian-registered except Thomas Jonsson.

S1600 Junior
All teams and drivers are Russian-registered.

GT4
All teams and drivers are Russian-registered.

Sports prototype CN
All teams and drivers are Russian-registered.

Calendar and results
The 2021 schedule was announced on 13 November 2020, with all events scheduled to be held in Russia.

Championship standings

Scoring systems

Touring / TCR Russian Touring Car Championship

† – Drivers did not finish the race, but were classified as they completed over 75% of the race distance.

Touring / TCR Russian Touring Car Championship Team's Standings

{|
| valign="top" |

Super Production

† – Drivers did not finish the race, but were classified as they completed over 75% of the race distance.

Super Production Team's Standings

{|
| valign="top" |

Touring Light

† – Drivers did not finish the race, but were classified as they completed over 75% of the race distance.

Touring Light Team's Standings

{|
| valign="top" |

S1600

† – Drivers did not finish the race, but were classified as they completed over 75% of the race distance.

S1600 Team's Standings

{|
| valign="top" |

S1600 Junior

† – Drivers did not finish the race, but were classified as they completed over 75% of the race distance.

S1600 Junior Team's Standings

{|
| valign="top" |

SMP GT4 Russia

† – Drivers did not finish the race, but were classified as they completed over 75% of the race distance.

SMP GT4 Russia Team's Standings

Russian Circuit Racing Series
Russian Circuit Racing Series
Russian Circuit Racing Series